Peter Skene Ogden Secondary is a public high school in 100 Mile House in the Canadian province of British Columbia. The school is administered as part of School District 27 Cariboo-Chilcotin. It is a grade 8 to 12 facility enrolling approximately 565 students. The principal is Ms C Currie.

The school offers regular classroom instruction in a semesterized timetable, as well as independent directed studies such as a First Nations Tutorial program, through a SMARTT electronic and self-paced delivery support program. The school also provides a Learning and Behavioral Support Alternate Program and a Learning and Lifestyle Support off campus Storefront Program. In addition to this, it also offers a French Immersion program for students who have completed the program through to grade 7.

It offers elective classes such as Food Studies, Outdoor Education, Art, Woodwork, Metalwork, and Computer Science, among others. Besides this, there are curricular classes such as Math, English, Science, and Social Studies. It also has a popular band program.

The school offers several after-school activities. These include specialized bands such as jazz band, senior band, and tour band, sports such as soccer, track, volleyball, rugby, and basketball, and a drama program. Clubs include a Gay-Straight Alliance, an Amnesty Club, and a Gaming Club.

Notable former pupils
 Michaela Pereira, co-anchor of New Day, the main weekday breakfast show on CNN
Lochlyn Munro, actor

References

High schools in British Columbia
Educational institutions in Canada with year of establishment missing